Aras Ören is a writer of Turkish origin, currently living in Germany. He was born in November 1939 in Istanbul, and moved to Berlin in 1969. He was editor of the SFB and head of the Turkish editorial team of Radio Multikulti of the RBB. In 1981, he received an honorary prize from the Bavarian Academy of Fine Arts. In 1985, he was awarded the Adelbert von Chamisso Prize. In 1999 he was a lecturer at the University of Tübingen. Since 2012 he has been a member of the Akademie der Künste, Berlin.

Ören writes in Turkish and helps to translate his works into German. Some of his works first appeared in German. His works include “What does Niyazi want in Naunynstrasse” (1973), “Privatexil” (1976), “Germany. A Turkish fairy tale ”(1978), “ Please no police ”(1981), “ Berlin-Savignyplatz ”(1995) and “Longing for Hollywood ”(1999). In 2014, Verbrecher Verlag published the volume of short stories Kopfstand, and in 2016 We New Europeans, both with illustrations by Wolfgang Neumann.

References

Turkish writers
1939 births
Living people